The 1908 College Baseball All-Southern Team consists of baseball players selected at their respective positions after the 1908 IAAUS baseball season.

All Southerns

Pitchers
James Redfearn, Georgia (H-1)
Harry Harman, Georgia (H-1)
Mitchell, Mississippi (H-1)
Walker Reynolds, Auburn (H-2)
Smith, Alabama (H-2)
Lane, Trinity (H-2)

Catchers
Corlis Buchanan, Georgia Tech (H-1)
Glenn Colby, Georgia (H-2)

First base
Dag Mallory, Mercer (H-1)
Morton Hodgson, Georgia (H-2)

Second base
Smith, Auburn (H-1)
Suiter, Trinity (H-2)

Shortstop
Del Pratt, Alabama (H-1)
Bond, Vanderbilt (H-2)

Third base
W. West, Trinity (H-1)
S. Ware, Tennessee (H-2)

Outfielders
Chip Robert, Georgia Tech (H-1)
W. Baker, Tennessee (H-1)
James Watson, Georgia (H-1)
Frank Foley, Georgia (H-2)
Pipkin, Vanderbilt (H-2)
Lee, Clemson (H-2)

Utility
Frank Martin, Georgia (H-1)

Key
H = selected by John Heisman It had first and second team.

References

All-Southern
College Baseball All-Southern Teams